Grazio Braccioli (1682–1752) was an Italian jurist, poet and librettist. Born in Ferrara, he wrote 9 libretti for operas produced at the Teatro Sant'Angelo in Venice between 1711 and 1715. Among them were the libretti for Vivaldi's Orlando furioso and Orlando finto pazzo.

A Doctor of civil and canon law, he lectured in both at the University of Ferrara. He was also a member of the Accademia degli Arcadi, for whom he wrote under the pseudonym "Nigello Preteo".

References

1682 births
1752 deaths
Italian opera librettists
Italian poets
Italian male poets
Italian male dramatists and playwrights